The 1982 U.S. Pro Indoor was a men's tennis tournament played on indoor carpet courts that was part of the Grand Prix Super Series of the 1982 Volvo Grand Prix. It was played at the Spectrum in Philadelphia, Pennsylvania in the United States and lasted from January 25 through January 31, 1982. First-seeded John McEnroe won the singles title.

Finals

Singles

 John McEnroe defeated  Jimmy Connors 6–3, 6–3, 6–1
 It was McEnroe's 1st singles title of the year and the 35th of his career.

Doubles

 Peter Fleming /  John McEnroe defeated  Sherwood Stewart /  Ferdi Taygan 7–6, 6–4
 It was Fleming's 1st title of the year and the 40th of his career. It was McEnroe's 1st title of the year and the 74th of his career.

See also
 Connors–McEnroe rivalry

References

External links
 ITF tournament edition details

U.S. Pro Indoor
U.S. Pro Indoor
Carpet court tennis tournaments
U.S. Professional Indoor
U.S. Professional Indoor
U.S. Professional Indoor